GFK may refer to:

Transportation 
 Grand Forks International Airport, North Dakota, United States
 Grand Forks (Amtrak station), North Dakota, United States

Other uses 
 GfK, a German market research organisation
 GFK (band), a Canadian hardcore metal band
 Fiberglass
 Ghostface Killah (born 1970), American rapper
 Patpatar language
 Gazişehir Gaziantep F.K., a football club in Turkey